Hearts of Chaos is a novel by Victor Milán published by ROC in 1996.

Plot summary
Hearts of Chaos is a BattleTech novel which features the return of Camacho's Caballeros, the mercenary team employed by Chandrasekar Kurita.

Reception
Jim Swallow reviewed Hearts of Chaos for Arcane magazine, rating it an 8 out of 10 overall. Swallow comments that "Hearts of Chaos makes a good read and the battle sequences are swift and dynamic."

References

1996 novels
BattleTech novels